Tennessee Johnson is a 1942 American film about Andrew Johnson, the 17th president of the United States, released by Metro-Goldwyn-Mayer. It was directed by William Dieterle and written by Milton Gunzburg, Alvin Meyers, John Balderston, and Wells Root.

It stars Van Heflin as Johnson, Lionel Barrymore as his nemesis Thaddeus Stevens, and Ruth Hussey as first lady Eliza McCardle Johnson. The film depicts the events surrounding the Johnson's impeachment, and "presents its title character as Lincoln’s worthy successor who runs afoul of vindictive Radical Republicans."

Like most U.S. historical films made during World War II, Tennessee Johnson has a strong underlying theme of national unity. The film depicts Johnson as a visionary who heals the rift between North and South despite the efforts of his shortsighted foes. In a climactic but fictional scene, he delivers an impassioned speech to the senators sitting in judgment of him, and warns them that failure to readmit the former Confederate states will leave America defenseless before its overseas foes. In fact, Johnson never appeared in person at his trial.

Plot
Runaway tailor's apprentice Andrew Johnson (Van Heflin) wanders into the Tennessee town of Greeneville. He is persuaded to settle there. He barters his services to the librarian, Eliza McCardle (Ruth Hussey), in return for her teaching him to read and write, and eventually marries her.

Stung by the injustice of the monopoly of power by the landowners and with the encouragement of his wife, Johnson starts organizing political meetings. One is broken up by the powers that be; in the resulting fighting, one of Johnson's friends is killed. He dissuades the others from resorting to violence. Instead, he is talked into running for sheriff and is elected. By 1860, the eve of the American Civil War, he has risen to the United States Senate.

When war breaks out, Johnson breaks with his state and stays loyal to the Union. As a general, he becomes a hero defending Nashville against a siege. Abraham Lincoln chooses him for his vice president in part because they share similar views on reconciling with the South after the war is won, unlike powerful, vengeful Congressman Thaddeus Stevens (Lionel Barrymore). When Lincoln is assassinated, Johnson succeeds to the presidency.

After he refuses to accept a deal offered by Stevens, the latter starts impeachment proceedings against the president, with himself as chief prosecutor. Johnson stays away from the trial on the advice of men who fear he would lose his temper. With his cabinet members denied the right to testify, however, Johnson appears at the very end and makes a stirring speech—an event which never actually occurred. The vote is close, with 35 judging him guilty and 18 not, but Senator Huyler is unconscious and unable to vote. Stevens, who is counting on him, delays the final verdict until Huyler can be roused and brought in for the deciding vote. To his dismay, Huyler votes not guilty. The film ends with Johnson, his term as president over, triumphantly returning to the Senate.

Cast
 Van Heflin as Andrew Johnson
 Lionel Barrymore as Thaddeus Stevens
 Ruth Hussey as Eliza McCardle Johnson
 Marjorie Main as Maude Fisher
 Regis Toomey as Blackstone McDannell
 J. Edward Bromberg as Coke
 Grant Withers as Mordecai Milligan, the murdered blacksmith
 Alec Craig as Sam Andrews
 Charles Dingle as Senator Jim Waters
 Carl Benton Reid as Congressman Hargrove
 Russell Hicks as Lincoln's emissary
 Noah Beery as Sheriff Cass
 Robert Warwick as Major Crooks
 Montagu Love as Chief Justice Chase (based on the real Chief Justice, Salmon P. Chase)
 Lloyd Corrigan as Mr. Secretary (based on Edwin Stanton, Lincoln's Secretary of War, retained by Johnson)
 William Farnum as Senator Huyler (based upon Senator Edmund G. Ross of Kansas)
 Charles Trowbridge as Lansbury 
 Russell Simpson as Kirby
 Morris Ankrum as Senator Jefferson Davis
 Mark Daniels as John Hay (uncredited) 
 William B. Davidson as Vice President Breckinridge (uncredited)
 Harrison Greene as General Grant (uncredited)
 Roger Imhof as Hannibal Hamlin (uncredited)
 Lloyd Ingraham as Vice President at End (uncredited)
 Alberto Morin as Clemenceau (uncredited)  
 James Warren as James Patterson (uncredited)

Controversy and inaccuracy
Critics complained that the film soft-pedaled Andrew Johnson's prejudice toward black people. Actor and comedian Zero Mostel, who was then just becoming a well-known name in show business, took part in protests against the movie.

According to paleoconservative writer Bill Kauffman, Tennessee Johnson is notable for the campaign of repression waged against it. Vincent Price, Mostel and Ben Hecht, among others, petitioned the Office of War Information to destroy the film in the interest of national unity. Kauffman surmised that Manny Farber had written the most intelligent opinion on the matterThe New Republic when he said: "Censorship is a disgrace, whether done by the Hays office and pressure groups, or by liberals and the OWI."

Although the film portrays Johnson delivering a speech at his impeachment trial, in actuality, Johnson did not appear at the trial on the advice of his legal counsel.

Reception
According to MGM records, the film made $570,000 in the U.S. and Canada, and $114,000 in other markets, resulting in a loss of $637,000.

References

External links
 
 
 
 

American biographical films
1942 drama films
1940s historical films
1942 films
American historical films
American black-and-white films
Films about presidents of the United States
Metro-Goldwyn-Mayer films
Films directed by William Dieterle
Films scored by Herbert Stothart
Films set in the 1830s
Films set in the 1860s
Cultural depictions of Andrew Johnson
Impeachment of Andrew Johnson
American drama films
1940s American films
Films with screenplays by John L. Balderston
Films set in Tennessee